The 2002–03 NSW Premier League season was the third season of the revamped NSW Premier League.

Clubs
Teams promoted from Winter Super League:
(After the end of the 2002 season.)
 Rockdale City Suns

Teams relegated to Winter Super League:
(After the end of the 2001–02 season.)
 Sutherland Sharks

Regular season

League table

Results

Finals series

Qualifying Finals

Semi-finals

Preliminary final

Grand final

See also
NSW Premier League
Football NSW

References

External links
NSW Premier League Official website

NSW Premier League Season, 2002–03
New South Wales Premier League seasons
Nsw Premier League Season, 2002–03